LVI may refer to:

56 (number), LVI in Roman numerals
Literacy Volunteers of Illinois, an American adult literacy organisation
Livingstone Airport, in Livingstone, Zambia
Landcare Victoria Inc., an Australian organisation
Load value injection, a security vulnerability
Lymphovascular invasion, invasion of cancer to blood vessels
Super Bowl LVI, an American football championship game being hosted in 2022